James Leon Stanfield (born 1934) is a former Welsh international lawn bowler.

Bowls career
Stanfield became the British singles champion after winning the British Isles Bowls Championships in 1966. He was a teacher by trade and was the Secretary for the Troedyrhiw Bowls Club.

References

1934 births
Living people
Welsh male bowls players